Paul Wyczynski, OC, FRSC (June 29, 1921 – November 27, 2008) was a Polish-born Canadian literature scholar who pioneered the study of French Canadian literature. A specialist of the work of Émile Nelligan, he spent his academic career at the University of Ottawa, where he founded the Centre de Recherche en Civilisation Canadienne-Française.

He was a member of the Royal Commission on Bilingualism and Biculturalism.

References 

 https://www.gg.ca/en/honours/recipients/146-4124
 https://ottawacitizen.com/news/obituary-paul-wyczynski

1921 births
2008 deaths
Officers of the Order of Canada
Fellows of the Royal Society of Canada
University of Ottawa alumni
Academic staff of the University of Ottawa
Polish emigrants to Canada
Polish resistance members of World War II
Chevaliers of the Ordre des Arts et des Lettres
Commanders of the Order of Merit of the Republic of Poland
Literary scholars